Julia Wong is an American film editor best known for her diverse body of work on blockbusters like X-Men: The Last Stand (2006) and Hercules (2014); comedies like Unpregnant (2020), Extract (2009) and Pink Panther 2 (2009); thrillers like Child's Play (2019); and the musical remake of Valley Girl (2020).

In film school, she won the Eddie Award for Best Student Editing from American Cinema Editors (ACE). After two decades in film and television, Wong has become a member of ACE as well as the Academy of Motion Picture Arts and Sciences. She won a Satellite Award for Best Film Editing on X-Men: The Last Stand, which she co-edited with Mark Helfrich and Mark Goldblatt. And she has been a guest speaker on panels for ACE, the Motion Picture Editors Guild, and the Los Angeles Asian Pacific Film Festival (LAAPFF).

Filmography

As Film Editor 

 The Seat Filler (2004)
 Santa's Slay (2005)
 Prison Break (TV Series) (2005)
 Pilot (2005)
 End Game (2006)
 X-Men: The Last Stand (2006)
 Good Luck Chuck (2007)
 The Pink Panther 2 (2009)
 Extract (2009)
 Red Riding Hood (2011)
 Chaos (TV Series) (2011)
 Pilot (2011)
 Plush (2013)
 Reckless (TV Series) (2014)
 Pilot (2014)
 Hercules (2014)
 Ken Jeong Made Me Do It (TV Movie) (2015)
 The Belko Experiment (2016)
 The Last Word (2017)
 Child's Play (2019)
 Gretel & Hansel (2020)
 Valley Girl (2020)

As Assistant Editor 

 Wedding Bell Blues (1996)
 Foolish (1999)
 Simon Sez (1999)
 Next Friday (2000)
 Stranger Than Fiction (2000)
 The $treet (TV Series) (2000)
 On the Borderline (2001)
 Tangled (2001)
 Out Cold (2001)
 Unfaithful (2002)
 Honey (2003)
 After the Sunset (2004)

References

External links

American film editors
American women film editors
Living people
Place of birth missing (living people)
Year of birth missing (living people)
21st-century American women